Strzegom  is a town in Świdnica County, Lower Silesian Voivodeship, in south-western Poland. It is the seat of the Gmina Strzegom administrative district (gmina).

As of 2019, the town had a population of 16,106.

History

Middle Ages

Traces of settlement on the site during the Roman Empire period have been found. In the Middle Ages it was a fortified settlement under the rule of a castellan, founded in the 10th century, as part of Piast Poland, first mentioned in a deed issued by Pope Hadrian IV in 1155, confirming the boundaries of the Wrocław diocese. Its name is of Polish origin and comes either from the words strzec ("guard"), strzyc głowy ("cut hair") or trzy góry ("three mountains").

As a result of the fragmentation of Poland into smaller duchies, Strzegom became part of the Duchy of Silesia in the 12th century. The Piast Castle was built at that time. At the same time the building of the St. Peter and Paul parish church began, from 1203 under the patronage of the Order of Saint John. To help rebuild the devastated region after the first Mongol invasion of Poland (1241), Strzegom town granted town privileges by Anne of Bohemia, widow of the Silesian duke Henry II the Pious. In 1248 it passed to the Silesian Duchy of Legnica under Henry's son Bolesław II the Bald, contested by his nephew Henryk IV Probus, who, imprisoned by his uncle at Jelcz, finally had to renounce Strzegom in 1277. Since the 13th century Strzegom was a center of clothmaking. In the 1290s the defensive walls were erected. In 1307 a Benedictine monastery was established. In 1318 a bell was placed in the Church of Saints Peter and Paul, it remains the oldest bell still operating in Poland.

From the late 13th century the town of Strzegom belonged to the Duchy of Jawor and Świdnica under Bolko I the Strict, and until 1392 was ruled by his descendants of the Silesian Piasts. Though they initially withstood the vassalisation attempts by King John of Bohemia, Strzegom subsequently shared the political fortunes of Silesia, and passed from Polish to Imperial Bohemian rule, Hungarian in 1469, again Bohemian in 1490, then under the Jagiellonian dynasty until 1526 and within under Austrian Habsburg sovereignty afterwards.

Modern era

During the Thirty Years' War the city suffered almost complete destruction, also the medieval Piast Castle was ruined, and in 1718 and 1719 fires struck the city.

In 1742 the town, under the Germanized name Striegau, became part of Prussia. On 4 June 1745 the Battle of Hohenfriedberg, an important victory for King Frederick II against joint Austrian-Saxon-Polish forces during the War of the Austrian Succession, took place near the town. During the Seven Years' War, Austrian and Russian troops occupied the city from 1760 to 1762, causing great suffering to the civilian population. During the Napoleonic Wars and Polish national liberation fights, Napoleonic troops occupied the town on 23 December 1806. In the ensuing three years, the city was forced to make total contributions of 100,000 talers. Polish troops were stationed in the town in 1807, and later also Prussian and Russian troops. During the German Campaign of 1813, Striegau suffered further financial losses and had to feed 5400 officers and 92,400 soldiers from both the Prussian and the French army.

The industrialization of Striegau began around 1860. Small factories produced steam boilers, steam engines, and agricultural machines. Five quarries produced granite, which became the most important source of revenue and employment for the city. The first rail link to the town was opened in 1856. In 1861, a gasworks opened. From 1871 the town part of Germany. The remains of the medieval Piast Castle were dismantled in 1888. In 1905 the town of Striegau had 13,427 inhabitants. The majority was Lutheran, with 4,783 Catholics and 100 Jews. By 1939, the population increased to 15,155. Despite Germanisation, the Polish newspaper Dla Wszystkich was published in the town from 1901 to 1918. After World War I ended in 1918, the Treaty of Versailles left the town within Germany. The economic crisis of the following years has led to an increase in unemployment, inflation, poverty and crime.

World War II
German troops stationed in the town took part in the invasion of Poland, which started World War II in 1939. During the war, Nazi Germany used an area close to the town as a subcamp of the nearby Gross-Rosen concentration camp. The Germans also established four labour units of the Stalag VIII-A prisoner-of-war camp. The Red Army captured the city on 13 February 1945; since German authorities had delayed permission to evacuate, a large population remained in the city at the time. The Soviet troops engaged in an orgy of gang-rape, torture, and murder against the civilian population, and numerous citizens took their own lives. The Wehrmacht recaptured the city on 11 March. The official German press widely circulated reports of Soviet atrocities in the city.  On 7 May, the Red Army captured Striegau a second time.

At the end of June, the Soviets put the city under Polish administration. Its historic Polish name Strzegom was restored. As a result of the Potsdam Conference in 1945, Strzegom became again a part of Poland, and its German inhabitants were expelled in accordance to the Potsdam Agreement. The town was repopulated with Poles, who in turn were expelled from former eastern Poland annexed by the Soviet Union as a result of the Hitler-Stalin Pact of 1939.

Post-war period
In 1945, a still operating agricultural machinery factory was launched, and in 1946 also a shoe factory was founded, it was closed in the 1990s. In 1962, the Culture Center was founded, and in 1997 a monument to Pope John Paul II was unveiled.

In 2012 the Jewish Cemetery of Strzegom was fully restored and renovated. Over 80 gravestones (Matzevahs) were repaired and returned to their original place. The project was jointly funded by Poland and the European Union, simultaneously introducing Jewish culture and history to the local townspeople.

Sights
The Gothic Saints Peter and Paul Basilica is one of Poland's official national Historic Monuments (Pomnik historii), as designated 22 October 2012. Its listing is maintained by the National Heritage Board of Poland. Other historic sights include churches, townhouses, medieval town walls with towers, and other historic buildings and structures.

Notable people
 Othmar Daniel Zinke (1664–1738), Benedictine abbot
 Johann Christian Günther (1695–1723), Baroque poet
 Friedrich Wilhelm Lange (1788–1839), Lutheran pastor and educator
 Rudolf von Seydlitz-Kurzbach (1812–1870), estate owner and court official
 Raffael Schuster-Woldan (1870–1951), painter and professor at the Prussian Academy of Fine Arts
 Kurt Hielscher (1881–1948), photographer and writer
 August Scharnke (1885–1931), professor of psychiatry at Marburg and Rostock
 Hans Christoph Kaergel (1889–1946), writer
 Werner Krusche (1917–2009), Lutheran theologian and bishop of Magdeburg studied at the Gymnasium.
 Peter Zvi Malkin (1927–2005), Mossad agent who arrested Adolf Eichmann
 Domitilla Veith (1928–2014), abbess of the Benedictine Abbey at Frauenchiemsee (Bavaria)
 Jutta Klamt (1890–1970), dancer and choreographer
 Roger Loewig (1930–1997), artist and poet
 Hans-Georg Koitz (born 1935), Roman Catholic bishop of Hildesheim (1992–2010)
 Herbert Obst (born 1936), Olympic fencer
 Krzysztof Szwagrzyk (born 1964), Polish historian and publicist
 Andrzej Stelmach (born 1972), Polish former Olympic volleyball player
 Paul Slowinski (born 1980), Polish-Australian kickboxer

Twin towns – sister cities
See twin towns of Gmina Strzegom.

References

External links

 Jewish Community in Strzegom on Virtual Shtetl
 

Cities and towns in Lower Silesian Voivodeship
Świdnica County